Molkuh (also Romanized as Molkūh, Malak Kūh, and Malek Kūh) is a village in Narestan Rural District, Aqda District, Ardakan County, Yazd Province, Iran. At the 2006 census, its population was 69, in 30 families.

References 

Populated places in Ardakan County